New Zealand is a representative democracy in which members of the unicameral New Zealand Parliament gain their seats through elections. General elections are usually held every three years; they may be held at an earlier date (a "snap" election) at the discretion of the prime minister (advising the governor-general), although it usually only happens in the event of a vote of no confidence or other exceptional circumstances. A by-election is held to fill an electorate vacancy arising during a parliamentary term. The most recent general election took place on 17 October 2020.

New Zealand has a multi-party system due to proportional representation. The introduction of the mixed-member proportional (MMP) voting system in 1993 was the most significant change to the electoral system in the 20th century. The Electoral Commission is responsible for the administration of parliamentary elections. The introduction of MMP has led to mostly minority or coalition governments, but the first party to win an outright majority since the introduction of MMP was the Labour Party, led by Jacinda Ardern, in 2020.

Local government politicians, including mayors, councillors and District Health Boards are voted in during the local elections, held every three years. These elections used both single transferable vote (STV) and first past the post (FPP) systems in 2007.

Overview of elections

History

The first general and provincial elections in New Zealand took place in 1853, the year after the British Parliament passed the New Zealand Constitution Act 1852. Women's suffrage was introduced in 1893, with New Zealand being the first modern country to do so.

The first election under the mixed-member proportional (MMP) system was held in  following the 1993 electoral referendum.

Electoral roll 
The electoral roll consists of a register of all enrolled voters, organised (primarily alphabetically by surname) within electorates. All persons who meet the requirements for voting must by law register on the electoral roll, even if they do not intend to vote. Although eligible voters must be enrolled, voting in New Zealand elections is not compulsory.

To be eligible to enrol, a person must be 18 years or older, a New Zealand citizen or permanent resident and have lived in New Zealand for one or more years without leaving the country (with some exceptions). People can provisionally enrol to vote once they turn 17, with them being automatically enrolled on their 18th birthday.

The Registrar of Births Deaths and Marriages automatically notifies a person's death to the Electoral Commission so they may be removed from the roll. Enrolment update drives are conducted prior to every local and general election in order to keep the roll up to date, identifying any voters who have failed to update their address or cannot be found.

The roll records the name, address and stated occupation of all voters, although individual electors can apply for "unpublished" status on the roll in special circumstances, such as when having their details printed in the electoral roll could threaten their personal safety. The roll is "public information" meaning it can be used for legitimate purposes such as selecting people for jury service but it can be abused especially by marketing companies who use the electoral roll to send registered voters unsolicited advertising mail.  According to Elections New Zealand, "having the printed electoral rolls available for the public to view is a part of the open democratic process of New Zealand". The Electoral Commission, in their report on the 2017 general election, recommended that roll sales be discontinued for anything other than electoral purposes.

Electorates and lists

New Zealanders refer to electoral districts as "electorates", or more colloquially as "seats". Since the 2020 general election there are 72 electorates, including seven Māori electorates reserved for people of Māori ethnicity or ancestry who choose to place themselves on a separate electoral roll. All of New Zealand is covered by a general electorate and an overlapping Māori electorate. According to the New Zealand Electoral Commission, "The Representation Commission reviews and adjusts electorate boundaries after each 5-yearly population census and the Māori Electoral Option."

All electorates have roughly the same number of people in them; the Representation Commission periodically reviews and alters electorate boundaries to preserve this approximate balance. The number of people per electorate depends on the population of the South Island, which as the less populous of the country's two main islands has sixteen guaranteed electorates. Hence, the ideal number of people per electorate equals the population of the South Island divided by sixteen. From this, the Commission determines the number of North Island, Māori and list seats, which may fluctuate accordingly. The number of electorates increased by one compared to the 2017 election to account for the North Island's higher population growth, creating Takanini; and the boundaries of 30 general electorates and five Māori electorates were adjusted.

Supplementing the geographically-based electorate seats, the system  allows for 48 at-large "list seats". A nationwide party vote fills these seats from closed lists submitted by political parties; they serve to make a party's total share of seats in parliament reflect its share of the party vote. For example, if a party wins 20% of the party vote, but only ten electorate seats, it will win fourteen list-seats, so that it has a total of 24 seats: 20% of the 120 seats in parliament. (See .)

Timing of elections

General elections 
New Zealand general elections generally occur every three years. Unlike some other countries, New Zealand has no fixed election-date for general elections, but rather the prime minister determines the timing of general elections by advising the governor-general when to issue the writ for a general election. The Constitution Act 1986 requires new parliamentary elections every three years. The 1910s, 1930s and 1940s saw three elections delayed due to World War I, the Great Depression and World War II, respectively: the 1919, 1935 and 1943 elections would otherwise have taken place in 1917, 1934 and 1941 (Parliaments passed Acts extending their terms). Also, governments have occasionally called early, or "snap" elections (for example, in 1951 in the midst of an industrial dispute involving striking waterfront workers).

The term of Parliament and the timing of general elections is set out in the Constitution Act 1986 and the Electoral Act 1993. Under section 19 of the Constitution Act, Parliament must meet within six weeks of the return of the writ for a general election, while under section 17, the term of Parliament ends three years after the return of the writ, unless Parliament is dissolved earlier by the governor-general. Section 125 of the Electoral Act requires that whenever Parliament expires or is dissolved, the governor-general must issue a writ of election within seven days. Section 139 of the Electoral Act provides further constraints. The writ must be returned within 50 days of being issued, though the governor-general may appoint an earlier return date in the writ itself. Furthermore, polling day must be between 20 and 27 days after the close of nominations. Thus, New Zealand law requires elections at least once every three years and two months, though elections are often held after three years, traditionally in November. The extra two months allow for some flexibility when returning to a fourth-quarter election after an early election, as happened in 2005 and 2008 after the 2002 snap election.

Early or "snap" elections have occurred at least three times in New Zealand's history: in 1951, 1984 and 2002. Early elections often provoke controversy, as they potentially give governing parties an advantage over opposition candidates. Note that of the three elections in which the government won an increased majority, two involved snap elections (1951 and 2002 – the other incumbent-boosting election took place in 1938). The 1984 snap election backfired on the government of the day: many believe that the Prime Minister, Robert Muldoon, called it while drunk.  The 1996 election took place slightly early (on 12 October) to avoid holding a by-election after the resignation of Michael Laws.

As in other Westminster-style democracies, the prime minister's power to determine the election date can give the government some subtle advantages. For example, if the prime minister determines a section of the population will either vote against their government or not at all, they might hold the election at the most advantageous time – as long as it is within three years. Party strategists take the timing of important rugby union matches into account, partly because a major match in the same weekend of the election will likely lower voting-levels, and partly because of a widespread belief that incumbent governments benefit from a surge of national pride when the All Blacks (the New Zealand national rugby team) win and suffer when they lose.

Tradition associates elections with November – give or take a few weeks. After disruptions to the 36-month cycle, prime ministers tend to strive to restore it to a November base. However, the convention was broken again for the 2014 and 2017 elections, which both occurred on the second-to-last Saturday in September. The 2020 election was initially scheduled to follow this new pattern, but was delayed by a month due to a resurgence of the COVID-19 pandemic, and instead took place on the second-to-last Saturday in October.

Local elections 

Unlike general elections, elections for the city, district and regional councils of New Zealand have a fixed election date. Under section 10 of the Local Electoral Act 2001, elections must be held on the "second Saturday in October in every third year" from the date the Act came into effect in 2001. The latest local body elections were held on 12 October 2019. The last local body elections were held on 8 October 2022.

Nomination and deposit of political parties and candidates 
A party that has more than 500 fee-paying members may register with the Electorate Commission. Registered parties may submit a party list on payment of a $1000 deposit. This deposit is refunded if the party reaches 0.5% of the party votes. Electorate candidates may be nominated by a registered party or by two voters in that electorate. The deposit for an electorate candidate is $300 which is refunded if they reach 5%.

Voting 

Election day always take place on a Saturday, so as to minimise the effect of work or religious commitments that could inhibit people from voting. Voting (the casting of ballots) happens at various polling stations, generally established in schools, church halls, sports clubs, or other such public places. In some elections, polling booths are also set up in hospitals and rest homes for use by patients, but this did not happen in the 2020 election because of COVID-19. Voters may vote at any voting place in the country, regardless of the electorate they live in. However, if the voting place they are voting in does not carry the correct electoral roll then a voter will have to cast a special vote.

Advance voting is available in the two weeks before election day. A dominating feature of the 2017 general election was the increased use of advance voting; 47% of the votes were taken in advance and grew from 24% in the 2014 election. In earlier elections, voters were required to provide reasons to vote in advance.  From 2011 and beyond, voters could use this service for any reason.  The Northcote by-election in 2018 was the first parliamentary election where more people voted in advance than on election day. In the 2020 election, 57% of voters cast an advanced vote.

If voters cannot physically get to a polling place, they may authorise another person to collect their ballot for them. Overseas voters may vote by mail, fax, internet or in person at New Zealand embassies or high commissions. Disabled voters can choose to vote via a telephone dictation service.

Voters are encouraged to bring with them the EasyVote card sent to them before each election, which specifies the voter's name, address, and position on the electoral roll (e.g. Christchurch East 338/23 means the voter is listed in the Christchurch East electorate roll, on line 23 of page 338). However, this is not required, voters may simply state their name and address to the official.

The voting process uses printed voting ballots. After the voting paper is issued, the voter goes behind a cardboard screen, where they mark their paper using a supplied orange ink pen. The voter then folds their paper and places in their electorate's sealed ballot box. Voters who enrol after the rolls have been printed, voting outside their electorate, or on the unpublished roll casts a "special vote" which is separated for later counting.

According to a 2008 survey commissioned by the Electoral Commission, 71% of voters voted in less than 5 minutes and 92% in less than 10 minutes. 98% of voters are satisfied with the waiting time.

New Zealand has a strictly enforced election silence. Campaigning is prohibited on election day and all election advertisements must be removed or covered by midnight on the night before the election. Opinion polling is also illegal on election day.

Local elections are held by mail. Referendums held in conjunction with elections are held at polling stations; those between elections may be done by mail or at polling stations at the government's discretion.

Voting in the MMP system 
Each voter gets a party vote, where they choose a political party, and an electorate vote, where they vote for a candidate in their electorate. The party vote determines the proportion of seats assigned to each party in Parliament, as long the party meets the electoral threshold. Each elected candidate gets a seat, and the remaining seats are filled by the party from its party list.

For example: A party wins 30% of the party vote. Therefore, it will get 30% of the 120 seats in Parliament (roughly 36 seats). The party won 20 electorates through the electorate vote. Therefore, 20 of the 36 seats will be taken by the MPs that won their electorate, and 16 seats will be left over for the party to fill from their list of politicians.

Vote-counting and announcement 

Polling places close at 7:00 pm on election day and each polling place counts the votes cast there. The process of counting the votes by hand begins with advance and early votes from 9:00 am. From 7:00 pm, results (at this stage, provisional ones) go to a central office in Wellington, for announcement as they arrive. Starting from 2002, a dedicated official website, ElectionResults.govt.nz, has provided live election result updates. The provisional results from polling places and advance votes generally becomes available from 7:30 pm, with advance vote results usually released by 8:30 pm and all results by midnight.

All voting papers, counterfoils and electoral rolls are returned to the respective electorate's returning officer for a mandatory recount. A master roll is compiled from the booth rolls to ensure no voter has voted more than once. Special and overseas votes are also included at this stage. The final count is usually completed in two weeks, occasionally producing surprise upsets. In 1999 the provisional result indicated that neither the Greens nor New Zealand First would qualify for Parliament, but both parties qualified on the strength of special votes, and the major parties ended up with fewer list seats than expected. The final results of the election become official when confirmed by the Chief Electoral Officer.

Candidates and parties have three working days after the release of the official results to apply for a judicial recount, either of individual electorates or of all electorates (a nationwide recount). A judicial recount takes place under the auspices of a District Court judge; a nationwide recount must take place under the auspices of the Chief District Court Judge. At the 2011 election, recounts were requested in the Waitakere and Christchurch Central electorates, after the top two candidates in each were separated by less than 50 votes.

Referendums by mail are scanned into a computer system, but not counted until the close of polling. When the poll closes at 7:00 pm, the scanned ballots are counted and the results announced soon after.

Voter turnout 

As shown in the table above, voter turnout has generally declined in New Zealand general elections since the mid-20th century. Concerns about declining democratic engagement and participation have been raised by the Electoral Commission, and by commentators such as Sir Geoffrey Palmer and Andrew Butler, leading some to support the introduction of compulsory voting, as exists in Australia. A system of compulsory voting looks unlikely to manifest in the near future with Prime Minister Jacinda Ardern arguing that it is an ineffective way to foster citizen engagement.

In its report after the 2014 election, the Electoral Commission issued the following statement: Turnout has been in decline in most developed democracies over the last 30 years, but New Zealand's decline has been particularly steep and persistent. At the 2011 election, turnout as a percentage of those eligible to enrol dropped to 69.57 per cent, the lowest recorded at a New Zealand Parliamentary election since the adoption of universal suffrage in 1893. The 2014 result, 72.14 per cent, is the second lowest. This small increase, while welcome, is no cause for comfort. New Zealand has a serious problem with declining voter participation. Of particular concern has been the youth vote (referring to the group of voters aged 18–29), which has had significantly lower turnout than other age brackets. A graph published on the Electoral Commission's website demonstrates the lower turnout in younger age groups. Those from poorer and less educated demographics also fail to vote at disproportionately high rates.

Orange Guy

Orange Guy is the mascot used in electoral related advertising by the Electoral Commission. He is an amorphous orange blob who usually takes on a human form, but can transform into any object as the situation warrants. His face is a smiley, and his chest sports the logo of the Electoral Commission. Since 2017 he has been voiced by stand-up comedian David Correos. In the 2020 general election campaign, he was joined by a dog, Pup, who is also orange and resembles a cross between a Jack Russel Terrier and a Dachshund. The Orange Guy icon is trademarked to the Electoral Commission.

Leaders' debates

Leaders' debates are televised during general elections in New Zealand. Traditionally these were held between the leaders of the two major parties, but since 1996, all party leaders with parliamentary representation are invited to a televised debate, still the two main party leaders may debate one-on-one in a separate debate. These events can prove decisive. For instance, at the 2002 election the United Future party boosted its rating in opinion polls following the successful performance of its party leader during a televised debate.

Lists of elections 
 List of parliaments of New Zealand, including election result statistics
 List of New Zealand by-elections
 Local elections in New Zealand
 Referendums in New Zealand

See also 

 Politics of New Zealand
 Electoral reform in New Zealand
 Voting rights of prisoners in New Zealand
 Political funding in New Zealand
 Opinion polling for the next New Zealand general election

References

Further reading

External links 
Electoral Commission website
Official election results website
New Zealand Election Study – analysis of elections by the University of Auckland
Adam Carr's Election Archive

 
Constitution of New Zealand